Edmund Moeller may refer to:

 Edmund Moeller (sculptor) (1885–1958), German sculptor
 Edmund Moeller (sport shooter) (born 1934), American sports shooter